Vesa Lahtinen (born September 16, 1968) is a Finnish former professional ice hockey defenceman.

Lahtinen played 110 games in the SM-liiga for Lukko, based in his hometown of Rauma, from 1988 to 1991. He also played in the 1. Divisioona for KooKoo, Kokkolan Hermes and Pelicans as well as in Denmark's Eliteserien for Hellerup IK and France's Élite Ligue for Anglet Hormadi Élite.

Career statistics

References

External links

1968 births
Living people
Anglet Hormadi Élite players
Finnish ice hockey defencemen
Kokkolan Hermes players
KooKoo players
Lahti Pelicans players
Lukko players
People from Rauma, Finland
Sportspeople from Satakunta